The Free Legal Assistance Group (FLAG) is a nationwide organization of human rights lawyers in the Philippines. It was founded in 1974 by Sen. Jose W. Diokno, Lorenzo Tañada and Joker Arroyo during the martial law era under former President Ferdinand Marcos. It is the first and largest group of human rights lawyers established in the nation. They work on countering varied abuses of human rights and civil liberties. Its current chairman is human rights attorney Chel Diokno, the founding dean of the De La Salle University Tañada-Diokno School of Law. Among their lawyers is former Supreme Court spokesman Theodore Te, currently representing Maria Ressa in her cyberlibel case.

Founding and martial law era work

FLAG was founded in 1974 by Sen. Jose W. Diokno, Sen. Lorenzo M. Tañada and Atty. Joker Arroyo - two years after the 1972 proclamation of Martial law under Ferdinand Marcos. Diokno had conceived the law firm right after being released from 718 days as the Marcos administration's political prisoner, as a means of supporting human rights victims through a new and innovative method called developmental legal aid.

During the dictatorship, FLAG defended farmers, similar victims of agrarian reform, and activists who were victims of paramilitary abuses, with Diokno noted to have helped even further by giving allowances to clients without any financial means. Most cases at this time regarding human rights abuses were handled by FLAG, in coordination with smaller groups such as the Task Force Detainees of the Philippines. Human Rights Primers were also an integral aspect of the advocacy of human rights that FLAG initiated in the Philippines.

FLAG's activities sometimes placed lawyers working with them at risk. Among the FLAG lawyers murdered during the dictatorship were Zorro Aguilar, Romraflo Taojo, and Crisostomo Cailing, all of whom have since been honored by having their names inscribed on the wall of remembrance at the Philippines' Bantayog ng mga Bayani, which honors the martyrs and heroes who fought against the Marcos' authoritarian rule.

FLAG has been a recipient of multiple awards such as the Concerned Women of the Philippines (CWP) Human Rights Award in the 1980s.

Recent history 
Among the recent advocacies of FLAG in recent years has been to help stem the tide of Extra-Judicial Killings linked to the Philippine drug war. There have also been cases linked to the libel case of Maria Ressa, as well as the case on the Anti-Terror Law of 2020.

Notable members 

 Roberto A. Abad, associate justice of the Supreme Court who first worked at the Jose W. Diokno Law Office as an associate from 1968 to 1969, then later joined FLAG under Diokno
 Zorro Aguilar, activist, newspaper editor, and human rights lawyer from Dipolog, Zamboanga who became a martyr during the late years of Marcos's militaristic regime. One of the 65 names first inscribed on the wall of remembrance at the Philippines' Bantayog ng mga Bayani, which honors him as Martyr of the resistance against the dictatorship.
 Jejomar Binay, vice-president, Chair of the Metro Manila chapter in the 1970s
 David Bueno, human rights lawyer, martial law activist, and martyr who defended Martial Law victims in Ilocos Norte, which was the native province of Ferdinand Marcos. One of the 65 names first inscribed on the wall of remembrance at the Philippines' Bantayog ng mga Bayani, which honors him as Martyr of the resistance against the dictatorship.
 Marvic Leonen, associate justice of the Supreme Court
 Rosario "Chato" Olivas-Gallo, Tañada-Diokno School of Law vice-dean, children's rights activist, and CEO of Christian Solidarity Worldwide, which is a human rights organization that protects persecuted Christians and is based in Hong Kong; Olivas-Gallo through Christian Solidarity Worldwide has also called for freer democratic processes in developing countries
 Kiko Pangilinan, senator and vice-presidential candidate
 Manuel Quibod, human rights lawyer specializing in taxation law, FLAG Regional Coordinator for Southern Mindanao, and Dean of the Ateneo de Davao College of Law
 Rene Saguisag, senator, professor, Manila Times columnist, and lawyer who served as the spokesman for President Corazon Aquino after the 1986 People Power Revolution
 Arno Sanidad, FLAG deputy secretary-general, law professor, and member of the Regional Council on Human Rights in Asia whose law office serves as FLAG's mailing address for filed grievances concerning abuse and reports of human rights violations
 Lorenzo "Erin" Tañada III, human rights lawyer, congressman, activist, and news anchor and broadcaster for UNTV
 Romraflo Taojo, Filipino labor and human rights lawyer, activist, and educator killed on April 2, 1985, when unidentified gunman believed to be part of a paramilitary group acting on orders from the militaryshot him in his apartment in Tagum, Davao del Norte. One of the 65 names first inscribed on the wall of remembrance at the Philippines' Bantayog ng mga Bayani, which honors him as Martyr of the resistance against the dictatorship.
 Theodore O. "Ted" Te, lawyer of Maria Ressa
 Haydee B. Yorac, Commission on Elections Chairwoman, Chairwoman of the Presidential Commission on Good Government, and Ramon Magsaysay Award Winner

See also 
 Jose W. Diokno
 Chel Diokno
 Lorenzo Tañada
 Human rights abuses of the Marcos dictatorship
 Task Force Detainees of the Philippines
 Bantayog ng mga Bayani

References

External links
  official website

Human rights organizations based in the Philippines
Jose W. Diokno